Jenin is a Palestinian city in the northern West Bank. It serves as the administrative center of the Jenin Governorate of the State of Palestine and is a major center for the surrounding towns. In 2007, Jenin had a population of approximately 40,000 people, whilst the Jenin refugee camp had a population of 10,000. Jenin is under the administration of the Palestinian National Authority (as part of Area A of the West Bank).

Etymology
The present-day Arabic name is believed to preserve the city's ancient name.

History

Ancient period
Jenin is identified with a number of important towns mentioned in ancient sources. Throughout history, it was referred to as "Ein Ganim", "Beth Hagan", "Ginah", and "Ginae", along other names. Tell Jenin, believed to constitute the original settlement core of the city, is located at the center of what is today Jenin's business district.

Bronze Age 
Jenin has been identified as the place "Gina" or "Ginah" mentioned in the Amarna letters from the 14th century BCE. At the time, it was a vassal state of the New Kingdom of Egypt. The people of Gina managed to kill the warlord Labaya during the reign of Pharaoh Akhenaten.

Iron Age 
Jenin is identical to Ein-Ganim, which the Hebrew Bible describes as a Levite city belonging to the Israelite Tribe of Issachar. It has also been associated with Beth-Haggan, mentioned in 2 Kings in connection with Ahaziah's flight from Jehu, before he is wounded at Ibleam and later dies in Megiddo. The Book of Judith renders its name as "Gini".

Roman and Byzantine periods
Josephus, a Roman-Jewish historian of the 1st-century CE, mentions "Ginae" as being in the great plain, on the northern border of Samaria. During the Roman period, Ginae was settled exclusively by Samaritans. The people of Galilee were disposed to pass through their city during the annual pilgrimages to Jerusalem. In 51 CE, a Galilean Jew was killed in Ginae by hostile Samaritans while en route to Jerusalem to celebrate Sukkot. With Roman procurator Cumanus failing to respond, Jewish Zealots led by Elazar the Son of Deinaeus (Ben Dinai) sought vengeance, and several Samaritan villages in Aqrabatene were destroyed.

Biblical commentator F. W. Farrar raised the possibility that this Samaritan village, "the first village at which [a traveler taking the road from Galilee to Judea over Mount Tabor] would arrive", was the one which rejected the disciples of Jesus in Luke's Gospel at the point where Jesus and his followers begin his journey towards Jerusalem.

Ceramics dating from the Byzantine era have been found here. There is no mention of Jenin in the reports of the Muslim Arab conquest of the Levant from the Byzantines, which, according to the historian Moshe Sharon, "is not surprising, since it was a small place of minor importance".

Crusader, Ayyubid and Mamluk periods
Jenin came under Crusader rule in 1103. The Crusaders called it Le Grand Guerin (Latin: Garinum or Gallina Major), to distinguish it from the town of Zir'in, which they called "Petit Grin". Under the Crusaders it was a small seigniory, forming part of the Principality of Galilee or the Kingdom of Jerusalem. 

Shortly before the Battle of Hattin in 1187, Jenin was captured by the Ayyubid sultan Saladin, who destroyed the nearby fort, Castellum Beleismum. In the 1220s, the geographer Yaqut al-Hamawi described Jenin as "a small and beautiful town, lying between Nabulus and Beisan, in the Jordan Province. There is much water, and many springs are found here, and often have I visited it." In 1229, a peace was concluded between Frederick II, Holy Roman Emperor and Sultan al-Kamil, during the Sixth Crusade, whereby the city was given to the Crusaders, but Sultan as-Salih Ayyub was able to control it permanently in 1244 after the Battle of La Forbie.

In 1255, it was agreed between the Ayyubid sultan in Syria, an-Nasir Yusuf, and the first Mamluk sultan in Egypt, Izz al-Din Aybak, to give the latter all of the lands lying west of the Jordan River, and thus Jenin entered into the possession of the Mamluks. It was one of eleven subdistricts of Mamlakat Safad (Province of Safed). In the late 13th century, Mamluk emirs (commanders) stationed at Jenin were ordered by Sultan Qalawun "to ride every day with their troops before the fortress of 'Akka, so as to protect the coast and the merchants." As one of the stations of the Mamluk barid (postal route) between the Mamluk capital Cairo and Damascus, it was one of the towns where fires were lit to warn of a Mongol attack. The geographer al-Dimashqi mentioned Jenin around 1300. From the time of Qalawun's son, Sultan an-Nasir Muhammad, it was a station on the route where ice was transported to Cairo for the sultans' drink houses. The Mamluk historian al-Qalqashandi (d. 1418) described Jenin as "an ancient spacious town which is riding on a shoulder of a nice valley in which there is a river of flowing water" north of Qaqun "on the top end of Marj Bani Amer [Jezreel Valley]". He also noted that it contained the mausoleum of Dihyah al-Kalbi, a companion of the Islamic prophet Muhammad.

Ottoman era

The Ottomans conquered Mamluk Syria in 1516. Jenin became the administrative center of a nahiya (subdistrict) of the Lajjun Sanjak (Lajjun District). The sanjak was officially called the Iqta (Fief) of Turabay until 1559 when it became officially known as the Lajjun Sanjak. The Turabay dynasty was the ruling house of the Bedouin Banu Haritha tribe, whose members held the governorship of Lajjun from the start of Ottoman rule through 1677. The tax registers from 1548–1549 report that Jenin had a population of eight households, all Muslim. They paid a fixed tax rate of 25% on agricultural products, including wheat, barley, summer crops, goats and beehives, in addition to occasional revenues; a total of 2,000 akçe. All of the revenue went to a waqf (religious endowment) in the name of the Mamluk sultan Qansuh al-Ghuri. Turabay rule was occasionally interrupted, including in 1564, when a certain Kemal Bey was appointed sanjak-bey (district governor) by the Ottomans. On 15 October 1564 Kemal Bey requested from the beylerbey (provincial governor) of Damascus that the stone caravanserai of Jenin be repaired, garrisoned and serve as the chief headquarters of the Lajjun sanjak-bey in order for Lajjun to prosper and for the road connecting Damascus to Jerusalem and Egypt to become secure. The official response was that the caravanserai be turned into a fortress; the fortress became ruined at some later point and 19th-century residents of Jenin used to claim that certain large rocks strewn in the village were the remnants of the 16th-century fortress. 

The Turabays, who remained nomads in the plain between Mount Carmel and Caesarea, made Jenin the administrative headquarters of Lajjun and used the town Izz al-Din Cemetery to bury their dead. A large, domed mausoleum was built for the grave of one of the chiefs and sanjak-beys of the family, Turabay ibn Ali (d. 1601). Known as Qubbat al-Amir Turabay (Dome of the Emir Turabay), it was described in a 1941 report as a ruined structure, and Sharon, writing in 2017, notes that it "does not exist anymore". No other graves of the Turabays in Jenin had survived into the 20th century. During the conflict between Fakhr al-Din of the Ma'n dynasty, who governed the sanjaks of Sidon-Beirut and Safed, and the Turabays, in 1623, Fakhr al-Din captured Jenin and stationed his men there. In 1624 the most prominent Turabay chief and sanjak-bey of Lajjun, Ahmad ibn Turabay, drove out the Ma'nid troops from Jenin and established his personal residence in the town.

In the mid-18th century, Jenin was designated the administrative capital of the combined districts of Lajjun and Ajlun. There are indications that the area comprising Jenin and Nablus remained functionally autonomous under Ottoman rule and that the empire struggled to collect taxes there. During the Napoleonic Campaign in Egypt which extended into Syria and Palestine in 1799, a local official from Jenin wrote a poem enumerating and calling upon local Arab leaders to resist Bonaparte, without mentioning the Sultan or the need to protect the Ottoman Empire.

In the late 19th century, some members of the Jarrar family, who formed part of the mallakin (elite land-owning families) in Jenin, cooperated with merchants in Haifa to set up an export enterprise there. During the Ottoman era, Jenin was plagued by local warfare between members of the same clan. The French explorer Guérin visited in 1870. In 1882, the PEF's Survey of Western Palestine described Jenin as "The capital of the district, the seat of a Caimacam, a town of about 3,000 inhabitants, with a small bazaar. The houses are well built of stone. There are two families of Roman Catholics; the remainder are Moslems. A spring rises east of the town and is conducted to a large masonry reservoir, near the west side, of good squared stonework, with a long stone trough. This reservoir was built by 'And el Hady, Mudir of Acre, in the first half of the century  [..], north of the town is the little mosque of 'Ezz ed Din, with a good- sized dome and a minaret."

British Mandate period

According to a census conducted in 1922 by the British Mandate authorities, Jenin had a population of 2,637, consisting of 2,307 Muslims, 7 Jews, 108 Christians, 212 Hindus and 3 Sikhs. From 1936, Jenin became a center of rebellion against the British Mandatory authorities. By the summer of 1938, residents of the city embarked on "an intensified campaign of murder, intimidation and sabotage" that caused the British administration "grave concern," according to a British report to the League of Nations. The city played an important role in the 1936–39 Arab revolt in Palestine, prompted by the death of Izz ad-Din al-Qassam in a fire-fight with British colonial police at the nearby town of Ya'bad months prior to the start of the revolt. On 25 August 1938, the day after the British Assistant District Commissioner was assassinated in his Jenin office, a large British force with explosives entered the town. After ordering the inhabitants to leave, about one quarter of the town was blown up.

Jenin was used by Fawzi al-Qawuqji's Arab Liberation Army as a base.

1948 War

In the 1948 Arab–Israeli War, the city was defended by the Iraqi Army, then captured briefly by the forces from Israel's Carmeli Brigade during the "Ten Days' fighting" following the cancellation of the first cease-fire. Prior to the battle, the city's residents fled temporarily. The offensive was actually a feint designed to draw Arab forces away from the critical Battle for Jerusalem, and gains in that sector were quickly abandoned when Arab reinforcements arrived.

Jordanian control
In the wake of the 1948 Arab–Israeli War, and after the 1949 Armistice Agreements, Jenin came under Jordanian rule. It was annexed by Jordan in 1950.

The Jenin refugee camp was founded in 1953 by Jordan to house displaced Palestinians who fled or were expelled during the 1948 War. In 2014 the camp had a population of 16,000. For 19 years, the city was under Jordanian control. A war cemetery for Iraqi soldiers and local combatants is located on the outskirts of Jenin.

The Jordanian census of 1961 found 14,402 inhabitants in Jenin.

Contemporary period

Jenin has been under Israeli occupation since the Six-Day War, in 1967.

On 14 May 1989, during the early months of the First Intifada. Mohammad Jibrin, aged 45, died in Ramallah Hospital after being beaten by Israeli soldiers in Jenin. Three months later, in response to a question from a member of Knesset Defence Minister Yitzhak Rabin wrote that there was no investigation by the Military Police Investigator.

In 1996, Israel handed over control of the city to the Palestinian National Authority in keeping with the Oslo Accords. Known to Palestinians as "the martyrs' capital", the camp's militants, some 200 armed men, included members of Al-Aqsa Martyrs Brigades, Tanzim, Palestinian Islamic Jihad (PIJ) and Hamas. By Israel's count, at least 28 suicide bombers were dispatched from the Jenin camp from 2000–2003 during the Second Intifada. Israeli army weekly Bamahane attributes at least 31 militant attacks, totaling 124 victims, to Jenin during the same period, more than any other city in the West Bank.

During the al-Aqsa Intifada, Israel launched Operation Defensive Shield with the stated aim of dismantling terrorist infrastructure so as to curb suicide bombings and other militant activities. The army encircled and entered six major Palestinian population centers in the West Bank, among them Jenin. During the Battle of Jenin (2002) in April 2002, 23 Israeli soldiers and 52 Palestinians, including civilians,  were killed. Human Rights Watch reported that the refugee camp, which was the major battleground, suffered extensive damage. Witnesses stated unarmed people were shot and denied medical treatment, and as a result died. Human Rights Watch have regarded many killings to be unlawful such as the death of a 57-year-old wheelchair bound man who was shot and run over by a tank despite having attached a white flag on his wheelchair. A 37-year-old man who was paralysed was crushed under the rubble of his house, his family was refused to be allowed to remove his body. A 14-year-old boy was killed as he travelled to purchase groceries during the temporary relief of the curfew that was imposed by the army. Medical staff were shot at (one nurse killed) while trying to reach the wounded even after clearly being in uniform displaying the red crescent symbol. There have also been reports of Israeli soldiers using Palestinians as human shields, one father described how a soldier rested his rifle on his 14-year-old son's shoulder as he shot. Israel denied the entry of rescue teams and journalists into Jenin even after they withdrew. Over the following years, Jenin was subject to extended curfews and targeted killings.

During a gun-battle with Islamic Jihad militants whom Israel says were firing at troops from inside the UN compound, an Israeli military sniper shot and killed a UN Relief and Works Agency (UNRWA) employee, Iain Hook (54) on November 22, 2002. The sniper reportedly mistook a cellphone in Hook's hands for a gun or grenade.

In the framework of the Valley of Peace initiative, a joint Arab-Israeli project is under way to promote tourism in the Jenin region. In 2010, 600 new businesses opened in Jenin. The Canaan Fair Trade is headquartered in Jenin. Director of the Freedom Theatre in Jenin, Juliano Mer-Khamis, was killed by masked gunmen in the city in April 2011. Mer-Khamis co-founded the theatre with Zakaria Zubeidi, former military chief of the al-Aqsa Brigades who had renounced violence.

On 6 February 2020, a Palestinian policeman, Tarek Badwan, was shot dead by an Israeli sniper as he stood at the entrance to the Jenin police station and chatted with a colleague. No explanation has been forthcoming. The incident was recorded on video. 

On 17 June 2022, Israeli forces conducted a raid in the al-Marah area of the city. During the raid, Israeli forces opened fire on a car, killing three Palestinians and seriously injuring another.

On 26 January 2023, Israeli forces killed nine in a clash with Islamic Jihad militants during a raid in the city and refugee camp of Jenin.

Geography
Jenin is situated at the foot of the rugged northernmost hills (Jabal Nablus) of the West Bank, and along the southern edge of the Jezreel Valley (Marj Ibn Amer), which the city overlooks. Its highest elevation is about 250 meters above sea level and its lowest areas are 90 meters above sea level. Immediately southwest of Jenin is the Sahl Arraba plain (Dothan Valley), while further south is the Marj Sanur valley. About 1.5 kilometers to Jenin's east is Mount Gilboa (Jabal Faqqua).

Jenin is 42 kilometers north of Nablus, 18 kilometers to the south of Afula, and 51 kilometers southeast of Haifa. The nearest localities are Umm at-Tut and Jalqamus to the southeast, Qabatiya and Zababdeh to the south, Burqin to the southwest, Kafr Dan to the west, Arranah, Jalamah and the Arab Israeli village of Muqeible to the north, Deir Ghazaleh to the northeast, and Beit Qad and Deir Abu Da'if to the east.

Government
Jenin municipality was established in 1886 under the Ottoman rule with no more than 80 voters and elections were made every 4 years until 1982 when the Israeli government took control over the municipality until 1995. 

List of Jenin mayors:

Andulmajeed Mansour
Abdulrahman Al-Haj Hassan
Ragheb Al-Souki
Al-Haj Hassan Fazaa'
Tawfeek Mansour
Bshara Atallah
Hussein al-Abboushi
Aref Abdulrahman
Fahmi al-Abboushi

Tahseen Abdulhadi
Abdulraheem Jarrar
Saleh Arif Azzouqa
Hussni Al-Souki
Ahmed Kamal Al-saa'di
Ahmed Shawki Al-Mahmoud
Shehab Al-Sanouri
Abdullah Lahlouh
Waleed Abu Mwais (appointed)
Hatim Jarrar

Municipal elections were held in Jenin on 15 December 2005. Six seats each were won by Hamas and the local coalition of Fatah and the Popular Front for the Liberation of Palestine. Jenin was one of several Palestinian cities where Hamas showed a dramatic growth in electoral support.
 The mayor of Jenin is Hadem Rida.

Demographics
According to the 2007 census by the Palestinian Central Bureau of Statistics, Jenin had a population of 39,004, the Jenin Refugee Camp of 10,371 with 9,571 registered refugees on 373 dunams (92 acres). Some 42.3% of the population of the camp was under the age of 15.

Public institutions and landmarks
The Khalil Suleiman Hospital is located in Jenin.

The city has a monument honoring German pilots shot down in Jenin during the First World War which incorporates an original wooden propeller. An old British Mandate landing strip, Muqeible Airfield, is located in Jenin. The main and largest mosque of Jenin is the Fatima Khatun Mosque, built in 1566.

Education and culture

The Arab American University is located in Jenin's vicinity.

Cinema Jenin is the largest movie theater in the area. The theater, which reopened in 2010 after a 23-year intermission, has indoor and outdoor screens, a film library and educational facilities. Strings of Freedom is an orchestra in Jenin founded by an Arab citizen of Israel, Wafaa Younis, who travels form her home in central Israel to teach music to the local youth.

Since 2010, the Gilboa Regional Council has been working with the Jenin district authorities on the development of joint tourism projects.

References

Bibliography

External links

Welcome To Jinin
Survey of Western Palestine, Map 8: IAA, Wikimedia commons 
A project aimed at reopening a movie theater for the residents of Jenin and the refugee camp.
Peace and Prosperity in the West Bank in-depth report on NOW on PBS
Heart of Jenin documentary on PBS wide angle

 
Bronze Age sites in the State of Palestine
Cities in the West Bank
Jenin Governorate
Municipalities of the State of Palestine
Palestinian Christian communities